= Rosalind Ward Gwynne =

Islamic studies scholar

Rosalind Ward Gwynne is an Islamic studies scholar and former associate professor emerita at the University of Tennessee.

== Biography ==
Gwynne completed her bachelor's degree in French from what is now known as Portland State University, earning a certificate in Middle Eastern Studies. She then pursued her MA in Middle Eastern Studies at the University of Washington, where she also received her PhD in Arabic language and philology and Islamic literature and theology.

She began her career at the University of Tennessee as an assistant professor of Arabic and was involved with the Asian Studies Committee. In 1987, she achieved tenure and was promoted to associate professor, later moving to the department of Religious Studies in 1988. From 1982 until her retirement in 2009, she acted as the advisor for the Muslim Student Association.

== Works ==
- Logic, Rhetoric and Legal Reasoning in the Quran: God's Arguments (2004)
